Estádio Conde Rodolfo Crespi, usually known as Rua Javari, is a multi-use stadium located in São Paulo's Mooca neighborhood, Brazil. It is used mostly for football matches and hosts the home games of Clube Atlético Juventus, which is also the stadium's owner, and hosted the games of Pão de Açúcar Esporte Clube. The stadium has a maximum capacity of 4,000 people, and was built in 1929. Estádio da Rua Javari is named after Count , who was Juventus' first president and helped the stadium construction. The stadium's nickname, Rua Javari, is the name of the street where it is located in.

As it has no artificial lightning, matches are not played after dusk. Clube Atlético Juventus usually schedules its home games to start at 3:00PM (4:00PM when DST).

History

On November 11, 1929, the stadium was inaugurated.

Until 1967, the stadium was owned by the Crespi family. However, in that year, after signing a deal with the family, Juventus become the stadium's owner.

Pelé states that his most beautiful goal was scored at Rua Javari stadium on a Campeonato Paulista match against São Paulo rivals Juventus on August 2, 1959. As there is no video footage of this match, Pelé asked that a computer animation be made of this specific goal.

The stadium's attendance record currently stands at 9,000, set in 1981.

In May 1997, Ugo Georgetti's movie Boleiros was filmed at Estádio da Rua Javari.

References

 Enciclopédia do Futebol Brasileiro, Volume 2 - Lance, Rio de Janeiro: Aretê Editorial S/A, 2001.
 Templos do Futebol

External links

 Templos do Futebol

Clube Atlético Juventus
Sports venues in São Paulo
Football venues in São Paulo
Tourist attractions in São Paulo